The Coast Valley League is a high school athletic conference that is affiliated with the CIF Southern Section (CIF-SS). As of the 2020–21 school year, members are small schools located in San Luis Obispo, Santa Barbara, and Kern counties. The league sponsors eight-man football.

Members
Coast Union High School
Coastal Christian School
Cuyama Valley High School
Maricopa High School
Shandon High School
Valley Christian Academy
San Luis Obispo Classical Academy (freelance)

References

CIF Southern Section leagues